Jerry Krupinski is a Democratic politician who formerly served in the Ohio House of Representatives.  A native of Steubenville, Ohio, Krupinski initially was elected to the Ohio House following the retirement of longtime Representative Arthur Bowers in 1986.

By 1990, he was serving as the chairman of the House Public Utilities Committee, a capacity he would serve in until Democrats lost the majority in 1994.

With term limits enacted in 1992, Krupinski was unable to run for another term in 2000.  However, his wife, Eileen Krupinski, entered the race to succeed him, and ultimately won. In all Krupinski served fourteen years, or seven full terms, as a state representative.

In 2004, Krupinski was mentioned as a potential successor to term limited Senator Greg DiDonato,  He entered a primary race for the seat, but ultimately lost to Charlie Wilson, who would go on to win the general election.  He also ran against John Domenick for his former Ohio House seat in 2008, however lost that primary also.

He has since remained retired in the Steubenville area.

References

Democratic Party members of the Ohio House of Representatives
Living people
1941 births
People from Adena, Ohio